František Čermák and Łukasz Kubot chose to not defend their title.
Philipp Marx and Igor Zelenay defeated Leoš Friedl and David Škoch 6–4, 6–4 in the final.

Seeds

Draw

Draw

References
 Doubles Draw

Ritro Slovak Open - Doubles
2009 Doubles